The following teams and players took part in the women's volleyball tournament at the 1980 Summer Olympics, in Moscow.

Rosters

Denise Mattioli
 Ivonete das Neves
 Lenice Oliveira
 Regina Vilela
 Fernanda Silva
 Ana Paula Mello
 Isabel Salgado
 Eliana Aleixo
 Dora Castanheira
 Jacqueline Silva
 Vera Mossa
 Rita Teixeira
Head coach

Tanya Dimitrova
 Valentina Ilieva
 Galina Stancheva
 Silviya Petrunova
 Anka Khristolova
 Verka Borisova
 Margarita Gerasimova
 Rumyana Kaisheva
 Maya Georgieva
 Tanya Gogova
 Tsvetana Bozhurina
 Rositsa Dimitrova
Head coach

Mercedes Pérez
 Imilsis Téllez
 Ana Díaz
 Mercedes Pomares
 Mavis Guilarte
 Libertad González
 Erenia Díaz
 Maura Alfonso
 Josefina Capote
 Nelly Barnet
 Ana María García
 Lucila Urgelles
Head coach
 Eugenio George

Ute Kostrzewa
 Andrea Heim
 Annette Schultz
 Christine Mummhardt
 Heike Lehmann
 Barbara Czekalla
 Karla Roffeis
 Martina Schmidt
 Anke Westendorf
 Karin Püschel
 Brigitte Fetzer
 Katharina Bullin
Head coach

Juliana Szalonna
 Éva Sebők-Szalay
 Gyöngyi Bardi-Gerevich
 Ágnes Juhász-Balajcza
 Lucia Bánhegyi-Radó
 Gabriella Csapó-Fekete
 Emőke Énekes-Szegedi
 Emerencia Siry-Király
 Ágnes Torma
 Erzsébet Pálinkás-Varga
 Gabriella Lengyel
 Bernadett Kőszegi
Head coach
 Gabriella Kotsis

Carmen Pimentel
 Gaby Cárdeñas
 Rosa García
 Raquel Chumpitaz
 Ana Cecilia Carrillo
 María del Risco
 Cecilia Tait
 Silvia León
 Denisse Fajardo
 Aurora Heredia
 Gina Torrealva
 Natalia Málaga
Head coach

Mariana Ionescu
 Gabriela Coman
 Doina Săvoiu
 Victoria Georgescu
 Ileana Dobrovschi
 Victoria Banciu
 Irina Petculeţ
 Corina Georgescu
 Iuliana Enescu
 Ioana Liteanu
 Corina Crivăţ
 Elena Piron
Head coach

Nadezhda Radzevich
 Nataliya Razumova
 Olga Solovova
 Yelena Akhaminova
 Larisa Pavlova
 Yelena Andreyuk
 Irina Makogonova
 Lyubov Kozyreva
 Svetlana Nikishina
 Lyudmila Chernyshyova
 Svetlana Badulina
 Lidiya Loginova
Head coach
 Nikolay Karpol

References

1980